Gamanashrama (pronounced gamanāshrama) is a ragam in Carnatic music (musical scale of South Indian classical music). It is the 53rd Melakarta rāgam in the 72 melakarta rāgam system of Carnatic music. This is the Carnatic equivalent of Marva in Hindustani Classical Music.

Gamanashrama is the Prathi Madhyamam equivalent of the 17th Melakarta raga Suryakantam

It is called Gamakakriya in Muthuswami Dikshitar school of Carnatic music.

Structure and Lakshana

It is the 5th rāgam in the 9th chakra Brahma. The mnemonic name is Brahma-Ma. The mnemonic phrase is sa ra gu mi pa dhi nu. Its  structure (ascending and descending scale) is as follows (see swaras in Carnatic music for details on below notation and terms):
: 
: 

The notes used in this scale are shadjam, shuddha rishabham, antara gandharam, prati madhyamam, panchamam, chathusruthi dhaivatham and kakali nishadham. As it is a melakarta rāgam, by definition it is a sampurna rāgam (has all seven notes in ascending and descending scale). It is the prati madhyamam equivalent of Suryakantam, which is the 17th melakarta.

Janya rāgams 
Gamanashrama has a few janya rāgams (derived scales) associated with it, of which Hamsanandi and Poorvikalyani are popular. See List of janya rāgams for full list of rāgams associated with Gamanashrama.

Compositions
A few compositions set to Gamanashrama are:

Meenakshi Memudam & Ekamranatham bhajeham by Muthuswami Dikshitar (also sung in Poorvikalyani)
Sri chakrapura vasini by Muthiah Bhagavatar
Idu neeku nyayama by Mysore Vasudevachar
Ubhaya kaveri by Veene Sheshanna
Ihame Sukhamu by Kotishwara iyer
Enni Maarulu ne vinna by Mangalampalli Balamuralikrishna

Film Songs

Language:Tamil

Janya: Poorvi Kalyāni Ragam

Related rāgams
This section covers the theoretical and scientific aspect of this rāgam.

Gamanashrama's notes when shifted using Graha bhedam, yields 2 other minor melakarta rāgams, namely, Jhankaradhwani and Ratnangi. Graha bhedam is the step taken in keeping the relative note frequencies same, while shifting the shadjam to the next note in the rāgam. For further details and an illustration refer to Graha bhedam on Ratnangi.

Notes

References

Melakarta ragas